Alias Billy the Kid is a 1946 American Western film directed by Thomas Carr and written by Earle Snell and Betty Burbridge. The film stars Sunset Carson, Peggy Stewart, Tom London, Roy Barcroft, Russ Whiteman and Tom Chatterton. The film was released on April 17, 1946, by Republic Pictures.

Plot
Texas Ranger Sunset Carson is given the mission of tracking down the notorious Marshall gang. Uncovering their hideout, he discovers the gang is led by Ann Marshall and is composed of three of her ranch-hands, Dakota, PeeWee and Buckskin. He soon learns, however, that they are in fact the innocent victims of a ring of swindlers and cattle rustlers led by the ruthless Matt Conroy.

Cast  
 Sunset Carson as Sunset Carson
 Peggy Stewart as Ann Marshall
 Tom London as Dakota
 Roy Barcroft as Matt Conroy
 Russ Whiteman as Peewee
 Tom Chatterton as Ed Pearson
 Tex Terry as Buckskin
 Pierce Lyden as Henchman Sam
 James Linn as Henchman Jack 
 Stanley Price as Frank Pearson
 Ed Cassidy as Sheriff

References

External links 
 

1946 films
1940s English-language films
American Western (genre) films
1946 Western (genre) films
Republic Pictures films
Films directed by Thomas Carr
American black-and-white films
1940s American films